Alabi is  a Yoruba name of West Africa.

Notable people with the surname include:

 Abiodun Alabi (born 1964), Nigerian police chief
 Akin Alabi, Nigerian music video director, writer and entrepreneur
 Anthony Alabi (born 1981), American football player and actor
 Biola Alabi, Nigerian businesswoman
 Bisi Akin-Alabi, Nigerian educator and social worker
 Goski Alabi, Ghanaian academic, author and entrepreneur
 James Alabi (born 1994), English footballer
 Johannes Alabi (–1820), leader of the Saramaccaans, a Maroon village in Suriname
Joshua Alabi (born 1958), Ghanaian academic and politician
Kayode Alabi (born 1963), Nigerian politician
Meji Alabi (born 1988), Nigerian music video director
Mojeed Alabi (born 1962), Nigerian politician and lawyer
Olatunji Ajisomo Alabi (1915–1998), Nigerian business tycoon
Oloye Akin Alabi (born 1977), Nigerian politician
 Ralph Alabi (1941–2009), Nigerian engineer and industrialist
 Rasheed Alabi (born 1986), Nigerian footballer
Samuel Alabi (born 2000), Ghanaian footballer
Sasha P (born Anthonia Yetunde Alabi, 1983), Nigerian singer and lawyer
 Solomon Alabi (born 1988), Nigerian basketball player
 Tope Alabi (born 1970), Nigerian singer
 Zainab Damilola Alabi (born 2002), Nigerian badminton player

See also
Halabi (disambiguation)

Arab families
Yoruba-language surnames